The 1936 Grand National was the 95th renewal of the Grand National horse race that took place at Aintree near Liverpool, England, on 27 March 1936.

Reynoldstown, a 10/1 shot owned and trained by Major Noel Furlong and ridden by amateur jockey Fulke Walwyn, won the race for the second year in a row after being left clear by Davy Jones running out at the last fence.

At the 17th fence, Avenger incurred a cervical fracture in a fall and was euthanised.

Finishing order

Non-finishers

References

https://web.archive.org/web/20131227085539/https://www.sportsbookguardian.com/horse-racing/grand-national/winners

 1936
Grand National
Grand National
20th century in Lancashire
March 1936 sports events